St. Clair Correctional Facility  is an Alabama state men's prison located in Springville, St. Clair County, Alabama.  The prison was originally built in 1983, and has an operating capacity of 1,514 inmates. The current warden is Guy Noe.

The facility was built in 1983. In April 1985 it was site of a major riot. Five employees were beaten and 22 others including the warden and his deputy were held hostage by inmates armed with guns. The prisoners complained of "barbaric conditions." 

Within a year period ending September 2014, six inmates had been killed in the facility.   The Alabama non-profit Equal Justice Initiative had already called for a change in leadership three months prior, after inmate Jodey Waldrop was killed in the early morning hours of June 3,  for what they described as a pattern of serious neglect and violence, including an incident when the then-warden punched a handcuffed prisoner.  As of June 2014 the prison was at 130 percent capacity. 

Press reports indicate that the facility is in a lawless condition. One expert cited "a total breakdown of the necessary basic structures that are required to operate a prison safely." 

In March 2016 a correctional officer was wounded by a knife, trying to break up a fight.  On May 13, 2016, another inmate was found dead of unknown causes.  

In June 2016 the Equal Justice Initiative filed a motion in federal court arguing that "severe overcrowding, understaffing and dangerous conditions violate the prisoners' constitutional rights," and that the prison's severe understaffing poses a safety risk to guards and correctional officers.  The facility runs at 59.5% of full staffing levels, giving it a staff-to-inmate ratio among the highest in U.S. prisons.   In the fiscal year ending in September 2016, there were 249 reported assaults at St. Clair.

References

External links 

 television news interview with St. Clair Correctional guard
 Vice Media article

Prisons in Alabama
Buildings and structures in St. Clair County, Alabama
1983 establishments in Alabama